Hunter v Hunter [1938] NZLR 520 is a cited case in New Zealand regarding trustees.

References

Court of Appeal of New Zealand cases
1938 in New Zealand law